Alon Weisberg (born 26 April 1989) is an Israeli professional footballer.

Playing career 
Born in the Ukrainian SSR, Weisberg moved to Israel when he was 6 months old. He grew up in the Hapoel Be'er Sheva youth ranks and in 2005 he moved to Maccabi Netanya. On 2 January 2007 he made his debut for Netanya's senior side in a Toto Cup game against Maccabi Tel Aviv, where he scored 2 goals.

Weisberg struggled to get a spot in Netanya and got loaned to Hakoah Ramat Gan, Maccabi Ironi Bat Yam, Maccabi Ironi Kfar Yona and Hapoel Herzliya from the Liga Leumit.
 
In July 2011 he left Israel for the Ukrainian First League when he signed a two years contract with FC Krymteplytsia Molodizhne worth approximately €100,000.

In August 2012 he trained with FC Vorskla Poltava and was injured and missed the 2012-2013 season due to injury.

In December 2013 he signed with Hapoel Katamon Jerusalem in the Liga Leumit. The next season, he signed a year deal with Maccabi Kabilio Jaffa in Liga Alef.

Club career statistics
(correct as of January 2014)

References

External links
 
 

1989 births
Living people
Israeli Jews
Ukrainian Jews
Israeli footballers
Maccabi Netanya F.C. players
Hakoah Maccabi Amidar Ramat Gan F.C. players
Maccabi Ironi Bat Yam F.C. players
Maccabi Ironi Kfar Yona F.C. players
Hapoel Herzliya F.C. players
FC Krymteplytsia Molodizhne players
Hapoel Katamon Jerusalem F.C. players
Maccabi Jaffa F.C. players
Liga Leumit players
Israeli Premier League players
Ukrainian First League players
Association football forwards
Israeli expatriate footballers
Expatriate footballers in Ukraine
Israeli expatriate sportspeople in Ukraine
Soviet emigrants to Israel